Polytrichaceae is a common family of mosses. Members of this family tend to be larger than other mosses with a thickened central stem and a rhizome. The leaves have a midrib that bears photosynthetic lamellae on the upper surface. Species in this group are dioicous. Another characteristic that identifies them is that they have from 32 to 64 peristome teeth in their sporangium.

Classification

Genera

Extinct genera 

 Eopolytrichum Konopka, Herendeen, Merrill & Crane (1997), Gaillard Formation, Georgia, USA, Upper Cretaceous (Campanian)
 Meantoinea Bippus,  Stockey,  Rothwell  & Tomescu  (2017) Apple Bay locality, Vancouver Island, Canada, Lower Cretaceous (Valanginian)

References 

 
Moss families